K. G. Saur Verlag is a German publisher that specializes in reference information for libraries. The publishing house, founded by Karl Saur, is owned by Walter de Gruyter and is based in Munich.

In 1987,  K. G. Saur was acquired by Reed International. Its British holdings were merged into the separate company Bowker-Saur. In 2000 Reed Elsevier sold K. G. Saur to the Gale Group, a unit of the Thomson Corporation. Walter de Gruyter acquired it in 2006.

References

Further reading

External links
  at Walter de Gruyter

Book publishing companies of Germany
Publishing companies of Germany
Mass media in Munich